Thea is an American   sitcom that premiered September 8, 1993, on ABC, and last aired on February 16, 1994, for a total of 19 episodes. Starring comedian Thea Vidale, the series marked the first time an African American female comedian was the star of a series named after her.

Synopsis
Thea Vidale starred as Thea Turrell, a widowed mother of four who worked in a Houston, Texas, supermarket by day and ran a single-chair beauty salon on the corner of her porch in the evenings.

Although the show initially attracted high ratings, viewership declined steadily over the course of the season, and the series was canceled after 19 episodes, having ended the season in 43rd place.

Cast

Main
Thea Vidale — Thea Armstrong-Turrell, the show's title role; the no-nonsense widow and matriarch of four children  
Adam Jeffries — Jarvis Turrell, Jr., Thea's responsible 16-year-old son
Brandy Norwood — Danesha Turrell, Thea's bashful 15-year-old daughter
Jason Weaver — Jerome Turrell, Thea's cunning 14-year-old son
Brenden Jefferson — James Turrell, Thea's seven-year-old son
Yvette Wilson — Lynette Armstrong-Russell, Thea's younger sister and Charles's wife
Cleavant Derricks — Charles Russell, Lynette's husband and Thea's brother-in-law

Recurring
Kenny Ford, Jr. — Leonard Thurman, Danesha's boyfriend
Miguel A. Nunez Jr. — Rickey, Thea's supervisor at Bagley's
Arvie Lowe, Jr. — Otis, one of Jerome's friends
Wesley Jonathan - Riddick, one of Jerome's friends

Guest
Blake Clark — Roy Bennett, Thea's boss at Mickey's Barbecue
Dennis Burkley — Walt Henderson, regular customer at Mickey's
Scotch Byerley — Claude Cooper, regular at Mickey's
Lou Myers — Otis's father

Episodes

Syndication
Reruns of the show aired on BET from 1994 to 1998 and returned to the same channel on Mother's Day in 2008, but stopped airing a few months later.

Ratings

Episode 1: 13.6/22, 20.7 million, #11
Episode 2: 10.4/20, 15.9 million, #29
Episode 3: 15.0/24, 23.4 million, #10
Episode 4: 10.1/17, 14.9 million, #52
Episode 5: 10.5/17, 15.4 million, #52
Episode 6: 10.3/16, 15.4 million, #53
Episode 7: 11.2/18, 17.0 million, #40
Episode 8: 10.0/16, 14.6 million, #57
Episode 9: 9.7/15, 15.1 million, #55
Episode 10: 9.3/16, 14.8 million, #56
Episode 11: 13.6/21, 22.2 million, #23
Episode 12: 9.6/16, 14.9 million, #54
Episode 13: 8.5/14, 14.2 million, #61
Episode 14: 11.4/17, 17.6 million, #45
Episode 15: 10.2/16, 15.0 million, #58
Episode 16: 11.5/17, 17.3 million, #47
Episode 17: 10.1/16, 15.6 million, #59
Episode 18: 10.7/16, 16.8 million, #48
Episode 19: 9.2/14, #46

Award nominations

References

External links

1993 American television series debuts
1994 American television series endings
1990s American black sitcoms
1990s American sitcoms
American Broadcasting Company original programming
English-language television shows
Television series about families
Television series by Sony Pictures Television
Television shows set in Houston
Television series by Castle Rock Entertainment